Casteilla or Estany del Castellar is a lake in Pyrénées-Orientales, Pyrénées, France. At an elevation of 2280 m, its surface area is 0.05 km².

Lakes of Pyrénées-Orientales